Food and Drug Administration, Maharashtra State, is Maharashtra's primary instrument of consumer protection. It is a law enforcement agency. In 1970, the Government of Maharashtra entrusted the responsibility of enforcement of the Prevention of Food Adulteration Act, 1954 to FDA which is when it got its present name.

External links
 Official website
 FDA cancels medical store license of whistle-blower

State agencies of Maharashtra
Pharmacy in India
1970 establishments in Maharashtra
Government agencies established in 1970